Hellinsia palmatus is a moth of the family Pterophoridae. It is found in Brazil.

The wingspan is 18‑19 mm. The forewings are creamy‑white and the markings are pale ferruginous. The hindwings and fringes are creamy‑ferruginous.

References

Moths described in 1908
palmatus
Moths of South America